Carlos Alfonso Azpiroz Costa, O.P., J.C.D. (born 30 October 1956) is an Argentinian friar of the Order of Preachers, better known as the Dominicans, who serves as a prelate of the Catholic Church.

Life

Early life
Azpiroz was born in Buenos Aires in 1956, the eighth of the 14 children (thirteen boys, one girl) born to Francisco Azpiroz Gil (died 1988) and Nélida Victoria Costa Colombo (died 1976). His father was an agricultural engineer who oversaw the large family holdings. His father's parents were immigrants from the Navarre region of Spain, while his maternal grandparents had come from Italy.

As a child, Azpiroz was enrolled at the Colegio Champagnat de Buenos Aires, run by the Marist Brothers, where he completed both his elementary education and his secondary, graduating in 1974. He then entered the law school of the Pontifical Catholic University of Argentina (UCA). After several years of study, he began to feel a certain restlessness about his future. In 1978 he met two professors at the university who were Dominican friars who taught moral theology at the law school. Through discussions with them and visits to their houses, he felt called to join their Order.

Dominican friar
On 1 March 1980, Azpiroz was admitted to the novitiate of the Dominican Province located at the Priory of St. Martin de Porres, in Mar del Plata. After completing this initial stage of his formation in the Order, he professed temporary religious vows as a friar on 28 February 1981. On 10 March 1984, he professed solemn vows as a full member of the Order in that same priory.

Azpiroz soon received his degree of Bachelor of Philosophy from Saint Thomas Aquinas University of the North (UNSTA), a private university operated by the Dominican Province of Argentina for its young friars. He began his theological studies at the Center of Institutional Studies, which operated at the Priory of St. Dominic of Buenos Aires, under the auspices of the theology faculty of the Pontifical Catholic University, at which he earned the degree of Bachelor of Theology. At the same time, he began his university teaching career, both as assistant of the chairs of theological anthropology and dogmatic theology, at the UCA (in the faculties of economics and law), and also as an assistant professor in the philosophy department of UNSTA. During this period, he shared in the work of his community in reaching out to the people surrounding the priory.

Azpiroz was ordained a deacon on 8 August 1986 by Cardinal Eduardo Francisco Pironio. He was later ordained by Pironio to the Catholic priesthood on 14 August 1987. In September 1989, the Prior Provincial sent him to Rome to study canon law at the Pontifical University of St. Thomas Aquinas (better known as the Angelicum) in Rome, where he was assigned to live at Santa Sabina Priory, the international studium of the Dominican Order. He also fulfilled various offices of the Order while pursuing his studies. In 1997 he was appointed the Procurator General of the Dominican Order, as well as rector of the Basilica of Santa Sabina, attached to the Dominican priory, by then Master of the Order of Preachers, Timothy Radcliffe.

On 14 July 2001, the participants in the General Chapter of the Order, which was held in Providence, Rhode Island, in the United States, elected Azpiroz to succeed Radcliffe as Master of the Order. During his tenure as Master, he was ex officio Grand Chancellor of the Angelicum.

In January 2008, at the General Chapter of the Order held in Bogotá, Azpiroz commented on his experiences in his role as Master of the Order:

Azpiroz served in this office for a nine-year term, ending with the election of his successor on 5 September 2010. Massimiliano Pironti painted Azpiroz' official portrait in oil as former Master of the Dominican Order. The portrait hangs in the Dominican Museum in Santa Sabina in Rome, Italy.

Bishop
On 3 November 2015, Pope Francis appointed Azpiroz the Archbishop coadjutor of the Roman Catholic Archdiocese of Bahia Blanca. He was ordained a bishop on the following 22 December by Guillermo José Garlatti, the Archbishop of Bahía Blanca, under whom he served until succeeding him as Archbishop on 12 July 2017.

References

1956 births
Living people
Argentine people of Spanish descent
Argentine people of Basque descent
People from Buenos Aires
Pontifical Catholic University of Argentina alumni
Members of the Dominican Order
Academic staff of the Pontifical Catholic University of Argentina
Masters of the Order of Preachers
Dominican bishops
21st-century Roman Catholic archbishops in Argentina
Roman Catholic archbishops of Bahía Blanca